Anita Blaze (born 29 October 1991) is a French right-handed foil fencer, two-time Olympian, and 2021 team Olympic silver medalist. Blaze competed in the 2012 London Olympic Games and the 2021 Tokyo Olympic Games.

Career

Blaze was born in Guadeloupe, an overseas region of France. She took up fencing at the age of four and learnt the sport in the club of Petit-Bourg. She quickly showed talent and was selected into a centre for promising athletes in metropolitan France. She won a team silver medal in the 2008 Cadet European Championships in Rovigo and an individual silver medal in the 2010 Junior World Championships in Baku.

She joined the French senior national team, with whom she earned a team silver medal in the 2012 European Championships in Legnano. She competed in the 2012 Summer Olympics in London as first reserve. After defeating Poland in the quarter-finals, France were routed 45–22 by Italy, whose team comprised all three individual Olympic medallists. France met South Korea in the final for the bronze medal. Blaze managed to reduce the 12-hit advantage acquired early by Korea, but France lost eventually 32 to 45.

In the 2012–13 season Blaze reached the quarter-finals in the Budapest Grand Prix and earned a double silver medal in the French national championship. She finished 30th in the Fencing World Cup, a career best as of 2014. She took another team silver medal at the 2013 European Championships in Zagreb, after France was again defeated by Italy. History repeated itself at the World Championships a month later in Budapest: France met Italy in the final and lost heavily 45–18, coming home with a silver medal. In the 2013–14 season Blaze reached the quarter-finals in the Tauberbischofsheim Grand Prix, but otherwise disappointing results and a calf strain caused her to be dropped from the French team that won bronze medals in the European Championships and the World Championships.

In the 2014–15 season Blaze climbed the first World Cup podium in her career with a bronze medal in the Torino Grand Prix, after she was defeated in the semi-final by twice World champion Arianna Errigo.

Medal record

Olympic Games

World Championship

European Championship

Grand Prix

World Cup

References

External links

 
  (archive)
 
 

1991 births
Living people
French female foil fencers
Olympic fencers of France
Fencers at the 2012 Summer Olympics
People from Baie-Mahault
Fencers at the 2020 Summer Olympics
Medalists at the 2020 Summer Olympics
Olympic medalists in fencing
Olympic silver medalists for France
World Fencing Championships medalists